City Fire Department may refer to:

City Fire Department (Columbus, Georgia), listed on the NRHP in Georgia

or any one of numerous other city fire departments, including, for example:
Kansas City Fire Department
New York City Fire Department
and there are many others.